Seeing Ear Theater was an internet based drama/re-enactment troupe attempting to capture the feel of older scifi radio plays. The content was originally maintained on the SciFi.com website and ran from 1997-2001. Episodes can be retrieved from the Internet Archive, but the episode numbers and dates are incorrect.

References

External links
 OTR Plot Spot: Seeing Ear Theatre - plot summaries and reviews.

American radio dramas
Syfy original programming
Internet Archive collections
American science fiction radio programs